The Infinite Steve Vai: An Anthology is Steve Vai's compilation album that was released in 2003 (see 2003 in music). This two-disc compilation spans Vai's entire solo career, featuring the best tracks from most of his albums including Fire Garden, Passion and Warfare, Alien Love Secrets and The Ultra Zone. One song is even included from his Whitesnake days ("Kittens Got Claws") and one from his Alcatrazz days ("Lighter Shade of Green"). The songs on the album do not appear chronologically relative to Vai's career.

This album mirrors Joe Satriani's album The Electric Joe Satriani: An Anthology. This is because both artists styles are very distinctive, but similar too, and Joe Satriani was Steve Vai's teacher at one point, which influenced his style.

In March 2011, the album was re-released as part of Sony BMG's The Essential series, named The Essential Steve Vai.

Track listing
All songs written by Steve Vai except where noted.

Disc one
"Liberty" – 2:04
"Die to Live" – 3:53
"The Attitude Song" – 3:22
"Salamanders in the Sun" – 2:25
"The Animal" – 4:02
"The Riddle" – 6:26
"For the Love of God" – 6:03
"Bangkok" (Björn Ulvaeus, Tim Rice) – 2:46
"Fire Garden Suite: Bull Whip/Pusa Road/Angel Food/Taurus Bulba" – 9:56
"Ya-Yo Gakk" – 2:54
"Blue Powder" – 4:44
"Bad Horsie" – 5:52
"Tender Surrender" – 5:05
"All About Eve" – 4:38
"Dyin' Day" – 4:29
"The Blood & Tears" – 4:25
"The Silent Within" – 5:00

Disc two
"Feathers" – 5:11
"Frank" – 5:08
"Boston Rain Melody" – 4:39
"Kittens Got Claws" (David Coverdale, Adrian Vandenberg) – 4:59
"Lighter Shade of Green" – 0:47
"Giant Balls of Gold" – 4:45
"Whispering a Prayer" – 8:47
"Jibboom" – 3:45
"Windows to the Soul" – 6:26
"Brandos Costumes (Gentle Ways)" – 6:05
"The Reaper" – 3:26 (From Bill & Ted's Bogus Journey)
"Christmas Time Is Here" (Vince Guaraldi, Lee Mendelson) – 4:21
"Essence" – 5:51
"Rescue Me or Bury Me" – 8:26
"Burnin' Down the Mountain" – 4:21

References 

Steve Vai albums
Albums produced by Keith Olsen
2003 compilation albums
Instrumental rock compilation albums
Hard rock compilation albums
Rock compilation albums
Heavy metal compilation albums
Epic Records compilation albums